Beyond the Nightmare Gate is the third book in the World of Lone Wolf book series created by Joe Dever and written by Ian Page.  It is one of four books in the mini-series and features Grey Star, for whom the first book is named, a young Wizard trained by the enigmatic Shianti to stop the Wytch-King and his Shadakine Empire. All four of the Grey Star books were released by Project Aon along with many of the other installments of the Lone Wolf series.

Gameplay
The gameplay of the World of Lone Wolf series is very much like the other Lone Wolf books, but features a few key differences. One is the inclusion of Willpower, which can be used for various Magical effects in the game, and maybe most importantly to loose a blast of Magic from your Wizards Staff when it is in your possession. The ability to vanquish some enemies with the expenditure of a Willpower point or two introduces a key strategic consideration in which the reader must choose between the likely loss of Endurance that comes with fighting enemies, and the amount of Willpower that should be saved for later in the story.

Plot
The series plays for the most part at the tip of south-eastern Magnamund, in the land then known as the Shadakine Empire. A tyrant called Shasarak the Wytch-King has subjugated the people and with the help of seven Shadaki Wytches is ruling with an iron fist. In an attempt to find the lost Moonstone of the Shianti and destroy the Shadakine empire, Grey Star made his way to the location of the Shadow Gate and beyond into the realm of the Daziarn itself. The Daziarn is a shadow realm with many strange beings and fearsome creatures inhabiting it. Grey Star is forced to travel across the gray plains of the Neverness to find the Moonstone but comes upon an unexpected ally; one he thought he would never see again. With her help, he must retrieve the moonstone and find a way to return to Magnamund if the Wytch-King is to be defeated.

External links
Project Aon - Beyond the Nightmare Gate
Gamebooks - Beyond the Nightmare Gate

Lone Wolf (gamebooks)
1986 fiction books
Berkley Books books